Séguénéga is a small town and the capital of the department of Séguénéga located in the Yatenga Province of the North Region of Burkina Faso.

Infrastructure 

 Séguénéga Airport

Demographics 
In 2006, the town had 18,314 inhabitants.

References

See also 

 List of cities in Burkina Faso

Populated places in the Nord Region (Burkina Faso)
Yatenga Province
Villages in Burkina Faso